The 2003 Individual Speedway Junior World Championship was the 27th edition of the World motorcycle speedway Under-21 Championships.

The final was won by Jarosław Hampel of the Poland.

World final
 13 September  2003
  Kumla, Kumla Speedway

+ Martin Smolinski replaced the injured Krzysztof Kasprzak (3rd in semi-final A).

References

2003
World I J
2003 in Swedish motorsport
Speedway competitions in Sweden